Rhymes & Reasons may refer to:

Rhymes & Reasons (John Denver album), or the title song, 1969
Rhymes & Reasons (Carole King album), 1972